Disciples Divinity House of the University of Chicago is a Christian seminary associated with the Christian Church (Disciples of Christ) and the University of Chicago Divinity School.

History
Disciples Divinity House originated through the effort of W. D. MacClintock, an English professor at the University of Chicago, and Herbert L. Willett; the school was chartered in 1894. By 1898 there were 20 students. The current limestone facility was completed in 1928.

References

External links
Official website

Universities and colleges affiliated with the Christian Church (Disciples of Christ)
University of Chicago Divinity School